The Jan Mayen hotspot is a proposed volcanic hotspot responsible for the volcanic activity that has formed the island of Jan Mayen in the northern Atlantic Ocean.

See also
Beerenberg volcano

References

Hotspots of the Atlantic Ocean
Geology of Norway
Volcanism of Norway
Geography of Jan Mayen